Bashirabad (also Romanized as Bashīrābād; also known as Ardeshīrābād and Shīrābād) is a village in Gamasiyab Rural District, in the Central District of Nahavand County, Hamadan Province, Iran. At the 2006 census, its population was 122, in 24 families.

References 

Populated places in Nahavand County